Patrick Riley McGeehan is a Republican member of the West Virginia House of Delegates and a former candidate for the United States Senate election in West Virginia, 2014. He is the son of Lt. Col. Mark McGeehan who died in the 1994 Fairchild Air Force Base B-52 crash.

Biography 
From 1998 to 2006, McGeehan served in the United States Air Force as an Intelligence Officer and Captain, and served tours in Afghanistan. After leaving the military, McGeehan joined the business sector. In 2006 he became President of Mountain State Packaging Incorporated in Newell, West Virginia, and in 2007 became President of Panhandle Industries in Weirton, West Virginia. Currently, he works as account director for Frontier Communications.

McGeehan represented the 1st District in West Virginia in the House of Delegates from 2008 to 2010.

As a member of the West Virginia House of Delegates, McGeehan served on the Constitutional Revision Committee, the Enrolled Bills Committee and the Government Organization Committee.

In 2010, McGeehan ran for the West Virginia Senate, District 1, but failed to win the GOP nomination.  In 2012, he won the GOP nomination for that seat, but lost in the general election.

In 2012 he released a book entitled Printing Our Way to Poverty: The Consequences of American Inflation, which received strong praise from Congressman and former Presidential candidate Ron Paul, as well as economist Dr. Andrew Young.

In April 2013, McGeehan announced he would be running for the United States Senate seat vacated by Jay Rockefeller.

On June 27, 2013, the Republican Liberty Caucus announced their endorsement of McGeehan.

On January 25, 2014, McGeehan suspended his Senate campaign and filed to run for his former seat in the West Virginia House of Delegates in 2014. McGeehan won election to his former seat in the November 4 general election.

References

External links 
 McGeehan for Senate 2014
 

1979 births
Living people
Republican Party members of the West Virginia House of Delegates
United States Air Force officers
21st-century American politicians
Stoicism